The Canadian Historical Review (CHR) is a scholarly journal in Canada, founded in 1920 and published by the University of Toronto Press. The CHR publishes articles about the ideas, people, and events important to Canadian history, as well as book reviews and detailed bibliographies of recent Canadian historical publications. The CHR covers all topics of Canadian history, ranging from Indigenous issues to liberalism to the First World War. The CHR has two major objectives: "to promote high standards of research and writing in Canada … and to foster the study of Canadian history."

Canadian Historical Review publishes articles in both of Canada's official languages, French and English. The Journal publishes both online and print versions, and subscribers can search for and read thousands of past publications via either CHR Online or Project MUSE.

History
The Canadian Historical Review was founded at the University of Toronto in 1920 as a continuation of a previous journal, the Review of Historical Publications Relating to Canada, itself founded by George Wrong, in 1897. The initiative to digitize the CHRs holdings includes material from this previous journal, and papers from as early as 1897 are available to subscribers online as a result.

The Canadian Historical Reviews entries have changed as history and historiography itself have progressed. Marlene Shore's The Contested Past: Reading Canada's History – Selections from the Canadian Historical Review, tracks these changes, tracing major themes of the CHR chronologically: "Nation and Diversity, 1920-1939; War, Centralization; and Reaction, 1940-1965; The Renewal of Diversity, 1966 to present; and Reflections."  The Contested Past also suggests that the key themes in Canadian history reflected by the CHR are "Native-European contact, society and war, the nature of Canadian and Quebec nationalism, class-consciousness, and gender politics."

Editors
The CHRs editors are Matthew Hayday and Jeffrey McNairn. Hayday, a professor at the University of Guelph since 2007, focuses on Canadian political history, particularly issues related to language policy, education, social movements, nationalism and identity politics. McNairn teaches nineteenth-century Canadian history at Queen's University, with special interest in the history of print, liberalism, British imperialism and state-civil society relations.

The Editorial Board comprises Harold Bérubé from Université de Sherbrooke, Jarvis Brownlie from the University of Manitoba, Kevin Brushett from the Royal Military College of Canada, Jordan Stanger-Ross from the University of Victoria and Shirley Tillotson from Dalhousie University. The Book Review Editor is Donald Wright from the University of New Brunswick.

Canadian Historical Review Prize
Each year CHR awards a prize for best article of the year, known as the Canadian Historical Review Prize. The winner for 2017 was Jan Noel, who won for her article "A Man of Letters and Gender Troubles of 1837", which appeared in the September 2017 issue.

References

http://muse.jhu.edu/journals/canadian_historical_review/toc/can.95.3.html
http://www.utpjournals.com/Canadian-Historical-Review.html
https://archive.today/20130620173259/http://utpjournals.metapress.com/content/120322/
The contested past [electronic resource]: reading Canada's history: selections from the Canadian historical review / edited by Marlene Shore.

External links
Canadian Historical Review archival papers held at the University of Toronto Archives and Records Management Services

University of Toronto Press academic journals
Academic journals published by university presses
History magazines published in Canada
History journals
Magazines established in 1920
Magazines published in Toronto
University of Toronto